Song Deok-Gi; (19 January 1893- 23 July 1987) was a Martial artist from Korea. One of the last practitioners of the ancient martial art of Taekkyon, he helped convey the art during the Japanese Occupation of Korea (1910-1945) and the Korean War (1950-1953). Based on his efforts, the South Korean government acknowledged Taekkyon as the 76th Important Intangible Cultural Properties of Korea and recognized him as a Human Cultural Asset (Ingan-munhwage). He used Hyeonam (현암; 玄庵) as a pen name.

Biography
Song Deok-Gi was born in 1893 in Sajik-dong, Seoul, in a family of Taekkyon practitioners. He was introduced by his father to renowned Taekkyon Master Im Ho (임호; 林虎) when he was 12 years old and began training under his tutelage for about 10 years. At that time, Taekkyon was practised as a martial art and a folk game by people in the vicinity of Seoul. Song learnt in a glade located on the flanks of the Inwangsan mountain near the Archery center called Hwanghakjeong (황학정; 黄鹤亭). At the time, the High-village or Widaepae (윗대패) designated those who lived inside of Seoul town walls and Araedaepae or Low-village (아랫대패), those who lived outside . Song Deok-Gi was from the Widaepae so he competed a lot with Araedaepae. Both village had their own style and techniques. After the Japanese annexion of Korea, indigenous martial arts became prohibited under Japanese cultural assimilation policies. Nevertheless, Song kept practising his Taekkyon skills in secret and never stopped training. He also practised Korean archery (Gungdo) and became the first official referee of the sport. In 1958, he showed a demonstration of Korean martial arts in front of the president Lee Seung-man for his birthday with Kim Sung-hwan (1904?-1958), another pupil of Im Ho. This event sparked the renaissance of Taekkyon and introduced the art to a new public.

Career
Song worked as a physical instructor for the Korean Army and the Royal guard before its dissolution by the Japanese. Later on, he became a professional soccer player and even won the Cup of Joseon in 1922. 
After the Korean War, he was virtually the only practitioner able to teach Taekkyon left. In the following decades, he passed on his knowledge to a new generation of masters, thus laying the seeds for the art's regeneration. Until his passing, he was known as "The Last Taekkyon Master of Joseon ".

The first of June 1983, Song became a national treasure as Taekkyon was designated as the 76th Important Intangible Cultural Properties of Korea by the Cultural Heritage Administration. To this day, it remains one of only two martial arts which possesses such a classification (the other being Ssireum). This recognition attracted many more students and helped secure the transmission of the art. Most leaders of the current Taekkyon Associations started their formation during that time. Song established the Widae Taekkyon Preservation Society with his student Lee Jun-Seo the same year.
He died aged 94 in 1987.

Honors 

 Skill Holder of Intangible Cultural Asset No. 76 Taekkyon.
 Living National Treasure No. 283. Relinquished after his death.

See also

Taekkyon
Korean martial arts
Intangible Cultural Property (South Korea)
Intangible Cultural Heritage of Humanity (UNESCO)

References

Further reading

(kor) “Taekgyeon” (전통무예 택견) by Song Deok-Gi (송덕기) and Park Jong-gwan (박종관):. Seoul: Seorim Munhwasa Publishing, 1983
(German) "Taekkyon – Wie Wasser und Wind" of Hendrik Rubbeling. Books on Demand, Norderstedt 2017, .
(eng) "Taekyon: The Korean Martial Art", by Stanley E. Henning, Robert W.Young, Willy Pieter, Yung Ouyang. Via Media Publishing Company, 2017.  originally published in Journal of Asian Martial Arts, 1993.

South Korean male martial artists
Korean culture
Korean martial arts
Intangible Cultural Heritage of Humanity
1893 births
1987 deaths